Phoenix Marketcity is situated in Kurla, Mumbai. It is developed by The Phoenix Mills Co. Ltd., and has a total retail space area of 1.14 million square feet. It houses 311 stores with domestic and foreign brands, including PVR Cinemas which has 14 movie screens and 70 restaurants. Its sister mall in Mumbai is High Street Phoenix, located in Lower Parel.

The nearest railway stations are Kurla railway station and Vidyavihar railway station. The nearest bus stop is Kamani.

See also

High Street Phoenix
Phoenix Marketcity (Bangalore)
Phoenix Marketcity (Chennai)
Phoenix Marketcity (Pune)
List of shopping malls in India

References

External links

Shopping malls in Mumbai
Shopping malls established in 2011
2011 establishments in Maharashtra